Ednyfed Fychan ( 1170 – 1246), full name Ednyfed Fychan ap Cynwrig, was a Welsh warrior who became Seneschal to the Kingdom of Gwynedd in Northern Wales, serving Llywelyn the Great and his son Dafydd ap Llywelyn. Ednyfed claimed descent from Marchudd ap Cynan, Lord of Rhos, 'protector' of Rhodri Mawr, King of Gwynedd. He was the ancestor of Owen Tudor and thereby of the Tudor dynasty.

As is usual with medieval orthography, a variety of spellings were used for his name in medieval sources, such as Vychan, Idneved Vachan, and Edeneweth Vakan.

Warrior
Ednyfed is said to have first come to notice in battle, fighting against the army of Ranulph de Blondeville, 4th Earl of Chester who attacked Llywelyn, this act of war was at the behest of King John of England. Ednyfed cut off the heads of three English lords in battle and carried them, still bloody, to Llywelyn, who commanded him to change his family coat of arms to display three heads in memory of the feat. Ednyfed probably went on a crusade on behalf the English crown to the Holy Land around 1235, although the evidence is not conclusive.

Seneschal
In 1215, he succeeded Gwyn ab Ednywain as Seneschal of Gwynedd, roughly equivalent to Chief Councillor or Prime Minister. His titles included Lord of Bryn Ffanigl, Lord of Criccieth and Chief Justice. He was involved in the negotiations leading to the Treaty of Worcester in 1218 and represented Llywelyn in a meeting with the king of England in 1232.

Family and estates
Ednyfed was married twice. His first marriage was to Tangwystl ferch Llywarch, a known mistress of Llywelyn the Great, the daughter of Llywarch ap Brân. His second marriage was to Gwenllian ferch Rhys, daughter of prince Rhys ap Gruffydd of Deheubarth. Ednyfed is recorded as having a dozen children and many more descendants, Professor Glyn Roberts of Dictionary of Welsh Biography noted, "Ednyfed's own descendants in the same period are found in the townships of Trecastell, Penmynydd, Erddreiniog, Clorach, Gwredog, Trysglwyn, and Tregarnedd in Anglesey, and in Crewyrion, Creuddyn, Gloddaeth, Dinorwig, and Cwmllannerch in Caernarfonshire. They are also found in Llansadwrn in Carmarthenshire and at Llechwedd-llwyfan, Cellan, and Rhyd-onnen in Cardiganshire ... descendants formed a 'ministerial aristocracy' of considerable wealth, and their widespread possessions, combined with the favourable terms on which they were held".

Ednyfed had estates at Bryn Ffanigl Isaf near Abergele and at Llandrillo-yn-Rhos, now a suburb of Colwyn Bay. At Rhos-On-Sea was palace of Llys Euryn on the hill of Bryn Euryn, the court was burnt to the ground during the Glyndŵr Rising, only to be rebuilt, and again for the same fate to happen in the 17th century, and the building to fall into ruin to date. Rhos Fynach sits on the seashore below the ruins. 'Ros Veneych', as it was called (now a restaurant and wedding venue), was granted to Ednyfed circa 1230. Excavations on the site found to have Roman coins from the time of Constantine the Great, and was probably used by Monks as a lay by to rest and fish on route to Aberconwy Abbey near Maenan, in the Conwy Valley.

Later years and legacy
Gwenllian died in 1236. On Llywelyn the Great's death in 1240, Ednyfed continued as Seneschal in the service of Llywelyn's son, Dafydd ap Llywelyn, until his own death in 1246. In 1240 Ednyfed served as a witness to a charter that Dafydd ap Llywelyn wrote for Basingwerk Abbey, alongside his brothers Grono and Heilyn. One of his sons, Goronwy ap Ednyfed replaced him in court working with the Princes of Gwynedd.

Ednyfed was buried in his own chapel, now Llandrillo yn Rhos Church, Llandrillo-yn-Rhos (Rhos-on-Sea), North Wales, which was enlarged to become the parish church after the previous one (Dinerth Parish Church) had been inundated by the sea during Ednyfed's lifetime. Ednyfed's tombstone has been incorporated into the church which was redeveloped in the 15th century.

Two other sons were successively Seneschals of Gwynedd under Llywelyn ap Gruffudd. Ednyfed's son Goronwy gave rise to the Tudors of Penmynydd in Anglesey, from whom Owen Tudor and later Henry VII were descended. After Llywelyn's death in 1282, the family made its peace with the English crown, though a descendant, Goronwy ap Tudur Hen joined the revolt of Madog ap Llywelyn in 1294–5, acting as Madog's Seneschal after his proclamation of himself as prince of Wales.

Ednyfed in legend: Ednyfed Fychan's Farewell
According to folk tradition, Ednyfed is said to have composed a farewell song to Gwenllian before leaving to take part in the Crusades. He was away for several years, and his family thought him dead. According to an old Welsh tale, Gwenllian accepted another offer of marriage. On the wedding night, a 'pitiable beggar' arrived at the house and asked permission to borrow a harp with which to entertain the party with a song. According to this legend the beggar sang Ednyfed's Farewell song and as he reached the last verse, removed his hat, revealing himself to be Ednyfed. He sang:
A wanderer I, and aweary of strife,
Get ye gone, if ye so desire;
But if I may not have my own wife
I'll have my own bed, my own house, my own fire!
Ednyfed then announced to the stunned throng:
"This was the tune 'Farewell' to my dear Gwenllian. Hence let her go with her new husband. My faithful harp, come to my arms."

Issue
By first marriage to Tangwystl ferch Llywarch he had:

 Sir Tudur ap Ednyfed Fychan, of Nant and Llangynhafal, Seneschal of Gwynedd (c. 1205 – 1278), married Adles ferch Rhicert, of Dinllaen; his issue included the Griffiths of Penrhyn and the second house of Tudors of Penmynydd
 Llywelyn ap Ednyfed Fychan, of Creuddyn
 Hywel ap Ednyfed Fychan, Bishop of Llanelwy (12351247)
 Rhys ap Ednyfed Fychan, (of Garth Garmon) (born c. 1205)
 Cynwrig ap Ednyfed Fychan, of Creuddyn
 Iorwerth ap Ednyfed Fychan "y Gwahanglwyfus" (a leper), of Abermarlais
Angharad ferch Ednyfed Fychan, married Einion Fychan ab Einion, (of Malltraeth)

By second marriage to Gwenllian ferch Rhys he had:

 Goronwy ap Ednyfed Fychan, Lord of Tref-Gastell, Seneschal of Gwynedd (c. 1200 – 1268, bur Bangor), married Morfudd ferch Meurig, of Gwent, daughter of Meuric of Gwent ap Ithel, Lord of Gwent.  He was ancestor of the first house of Tudors of Penmynydd, and hence of the House of Tudor.
 Gruffudd ap Ednyfed Fychan, ancestor of the Griffiths of Wychnor, including "the wealthiest and most influential figure among the native gentry of the 14th century", Sir Rhys ap Gruffydd.
 Gwladus ferch Ednyfed Fychan, married Tegwared ap Cynwrig.
 Gwenllian ferch Ednyfed Fychan, married Tegwared y Baiswen, illegitimate son of Llywelyn the Great, Prince of Gwynedd.

By one of his marriages he had:
 Gwenllian ferch Ednyfed Fychan, married firstly Sir Aron ap Rhys, Knight of the Order of the Holy Sepulchre, and married secondly Gwrwared ap Gwilym.

Out of wedlock, he had by an unknown woman:
 Tudur Gwilltyn ap Ednyfed Fychan

References

Notes

Works cited

1170s births
1246 deaths
Year of birth uncertain
Ednyfed
People from Denbighshire
Welsh soldiers
12th-century Welsh nobility
13th-century Welsh nobility